2019 Pro Volleyball League is the inaugural season of the Indian Indoor Volleyball League known as Pro Volleyball League organized under the supervision of Volleyball Federation of India in association with Baseline Ventures.This season was composed of six teams. The league is approved by FIVB. The inaugural season was won by Chennai Spartans.

Teams

Regular season

|}
Legend:

 

Source:

Results

|}

Play–offs

Semifinals
Top four teams of Regular season are qualified to two different semifinal pairs.

Semifinal 1

   |}

Semifinal 2

 |}

Final

 
|}

Final standing

References

Volleyball in India
Pro Volleyball League